The Carnegie Library of Pittsburgh is the public library system in Pittsburgh, Pennsylvania. Its main branch is located in the Oakland neighborhood of Pittsburgh, and it has 19 branch locations throughout the city.  Like hundreds of other Carnegie libraries, the construction of the main library, which opened in 1895, and several neighborhood branches, was funded by industrialist Andrew Carnegie.  The Pittsburgh area houses the first branches in the United States.

The Pittsburgh Photographic Library is a photography repository held by the Carnegie Library of Pittsburgh of over 50,000 prints and negatives relating to history of Pittsburgh.

History 
The City of Pittsburgh was originally home to eight Carnegie libraries constructed at the turn of the twentieth century. In 1881, Andrew Carnegie offered a US$250,000 grant to the city for the construction of a public library on the condition that the city provided the land and annual funding for the maintenance of the property.  The city declined Carnegie's initial offer out of concern that a publicly funded library was not a state-sanctioned use of public tax funds.  With the passing of several years and the state legislature's endorsement of the project, however, the city reconsidered the offer and reached out to Carnegie in the interest of accepting his grant.

In 1890, the City of Pittsburgh accepted an expanded grant of $1 million for the building of the main library in Oakland and five branches in the neighborhoods of Lawrenceville, West End, Wylie Avenue (Hill District), Mount Washington, and Hazelwood.  While the initial plan only called for those five branches, the city later received another three Carnegie libraries in the East Liberty, South Side, and Homewood neighborhoods.  Construction on the main library was finished in 1895 while the branch libraries were constructed over the following fifteen years, ending with the completion of the Homewood branch in 1910.

Six of the original Carnegie library branch locations continue to serve as public libraries in their respective neighborhoods: Lawrenceville, West End, Mount Washington, Hazelwood, South Side, and Homewood.  The East Liberty branch was demolished in the 1960s as part of a redevelopment plan, and the Wylie Avenue branch was moved to a new location in 1982.

In January 2022, the 201 members of the United Library Workers (ULW), the union of library staff, which organized with United Steelworkers in 2019, ratified their first contract with the library's management. Environmental service workers and drivers had already been unionized with the Teamsters and SEIU.

Branches
 Allegheny
 Beechview
 Brookline
 Carrick
 Downtown and Business
 East Liberty
 Hazelwood
 Hill District
 Homewood
 Knoxville
 Lawrenceville
 Library of Accessible Media for Pennsylvanians (formerly Library for the Blind and Physically Handicapped) (Bloomfield)
 Main (Oakland)
 Mt. Washington
 Sheraden
 South Side
 Squirrel Hill
 West End
 Woods Run

Partnership with suburban branches
For decades, CLP has partnered with suburban area branches, and, in 2014, talks were started seeking innovative ways to combine some services.

Theft case 
In 2018, it was reported that nearly 320 rare books, maps, engravings, and other items had been stolen from the Carnegie Library of Pittsburgh's main branch in Oakland, which houses the system's rare book collection.  The items, including a 1787 document signed by Thomas Jefferson, were valued at more than $8 million.  In July 2018, a former library archivist and a Pittsburgh-area bookseller were charged with the thefts, which took place over a period of two decades.

It was one of the largest rare-book theft cases in history. According to the criminal complaints detailing alleged scheme, the archivist said that he "often removed items from the Oliver Room at the library's main branch in Oakland by carrying individual plates [and] maps in manila folders, or for books or larger items, by brazenly rolling them up and walking out." The archivist is alleged to have turned the rare items over to the bookseller, who would then sell them through his store.

See also

Allegheny Regional Asset District
Pennsylvania Library Association

References

External links
 Carnegie Library of Pittsburgh
 
 

Library buildings completed in 1895
Libraries on the National Register of Historic Places in Pennsylvania
Public libraries in Pennsylvania
Libraries in Allegheny County, Pennsylvania
Tourist attractions in Pittsburgh
Carnegie libraries in Pennsylvania
Education in Pittsburgh
Pittsburgh History & Landmarks Foundation Historic Landmarks
1890 establishments in Pennsylvania
National Register of Historic Places in Pittsburgh